Samfälligheten för Nordisk Sed is a Swedish modern pagan organisation founded in 1997. It adheres to a version of Nordic neopaganism that emphasises folk beliefs and claims an unbroken continuity through these. The organisation has few members and is closed to outsiders.

History
Begun in 1996 as "a network of independent kindreds", Samfälligheten för Nordisk Sed was formally founded in 1997. In 2000 it was one of the first religious organisations registered as a registrerat trossamfund due to the new Swedish laws. It changed its organisational structure to comply with judicial state demands required for this recognition. According to the scholar Fredrik Gregorius, the organisation seemed to only have a handful of members as of 2016.

Activities and beliefs
Samfälligheten för Nordisk Sed is one of the proponents of the folk belief approach to Nordic neopaganism, meaning it claims an unbroken continuity through folklore and popular traditions.

The organisation is closed to outsiders and does not collaborate with other religious groups. It does not recognise other modern pagan organisations in Sweden as genuine, and rejects attempts to place it within a larger religious milieu.

References

External links
 Official website 

1997 establishments in Sweden
Germanic neopagan organisations
Modern pagan organizations based in Sweden
Modern pagan organizations established in 1997